Sandra Bolden Cunningham (born September 4, 1950) is an American Democratic Party politician, who has been serving in the New Jersey State Senate since 2007, where she represents the 31st Legislative District. She was sworn into office on November 8, 2007. She is the widow of former Jersey City Mayor Glenn Cunningham, who died in 2004.

Early life and education
Sandra Bolden was born on September 4, 1950, and was raised in Newark. She graduated from West Side High School and received a B.A. from Bloomfield College with a major in liberal arts.

Early career 
Bolden was an actress and was a part of the Negro Ensemble Company. She became the executive of the Hudson County Bar Association in 1988 after working various county jobs in Essex County.

Political career
Following her husband's death, there were reports of interest by Cunningham to seek her late husband's Senate seat to which he was elected in 2003 and was reported to be considering a run for Mayor of Jersey City in a May 2005 special election.  She became president of the Sandra and Glenn Cunningham Foundation and has supported causes in Jersey City through the foundation.  In 2006 signs in Jersey City touted her as a candidate for the U.S. Senate vs. Sen. Robert Menendez and State Sen. Tom Kean Jr. Menendez and her late husband were bitter political rivals.  She did not seek the U.S. Senate seat and announced her candidacy for the state senate in the Democratic primary against Sen. Joseph Doria in 2007.

Doria, the mayor of Bayonne, dropped out of the race in March 2007.  Assemblyman Louis Manzo, who first won his seat on a ticket with Mayor Cunningham, challenged Cunningham in the Democratic primary for the Senate. During the primary race, Cunningham received the support of the Hudson County Democratic Organization and Jersey City Mayor Jerramiah Healy, who had previously opposed her and her late husband. One of Cunningham's running mates for the Assembly was former State Sen. L. Harvey Smith, who had been defeated by her husband in a bitter 2003 Senate primary. Cunningham defeated Assemblyman Manzo in the Democratic primary in June 2007. She was virtually unopposed in the November general election, defeating independent candidate Louis Vernotico with over 87% of the vote.

Following Doria's October 2007 resignation to become Commissioner of the New Jersey Department of Community Affairs, Cunningham was elected on October 23, 2007, by a special election convention to serve the remainder of Doria's term, which expired in January 2008. Cunningham served the remainder of Doria's term before beginning her own four-year term and was sworn into the state senate on November 8, 2007.

In the Senate, she has been assigned to serve as chair of the Higher Education; she also sits on the Budget and Appropriations Committee and Labor Committee. She is the current senate majority whip, holding the position since 2008.

In 2012, The Hudson Reporter named her #6 in its list of Hudson County's 50 most influential people, with North Bergen mayor and State Senator Nicholas Sacco ranked first on the list.

District 31
Each of the 40 districts in the New Jersey Legislature has one representative in the New Jersey Senate and two members in the New Jersey General Assembly. The representatives from the 31st District for the 2022—23 Legislative Session are:
Senator Sandra Bolden Cunningham
Assemblywoman Angela V. McKnight
Assemblyman William Sampson

Personal life

Spouse 
Sandra Cunningham began dating Jersey City police officer and councilman Glenn Cunningham in 1990 and got married on January 7, 1998, in Nassau, Bahamas. While Glenn Cunningham was campaigning for and later won the Jersey City mayoral election in 2001, Sandra Cunningham often accompanied her husband at public events and political meetings. Glenn Cunningham died on May 25, 2004, of a heart attack.

DWI Incidents 
In 2006, Cunningham pled guilty to operating a vehicle under the influence of drugs or alcohol. The 2006 guilty plea stemmed from a ticketed incident in November 2005. During the incident, she had a blood alcohol concentration of .18, according to public records. She paid a $708 fine.

In March 2021, Cunningham was charged for driving while intoxicated after sideswiping two cars parked near her home with her Infiniti G35x.  On 3 June 2021, Cunningham plead not guilty to the DWI and careless driving charges; the case is currently pending trial and discovery. If found guilty, Cunningham could face "from 2 to 90 days in jail and a one year loss of her driver’s license."

Election history

References

External links
Senator Cunningham's legislative webpage, New Jersey Legislature
New Jersey Legislature financial disclosure forms
2011 2010 2009 2008 2007 2006
Senate campaign website

|-

1950 births
20th-century African-American people
20th-century African-American women
21st-century African-American politicians
21st-century African-American women
21st-century American politicians
21st-century American women politicians
African-American state legislators in New Jersey
African-American women in politics
Bloomfield College alumni
Living people
Democratic Party New Jersey state senators
Politicians from Jersey City, New Jersey
Politicians from Newark, New Jersey
West Side High School (New Jersey) alumni
Women state legislators in New Jersey